!PAUS3, or THEE PAUSE, (born July 27, 1981) is an international platinum selling musician and artist, who began his career in his early teens in the former Soviet Bloc nations of Ukraine, Romania and Bulgaria.

Biography
THEE PAUSE is originally from Philadelphia, Pennsylvania and currently based in the New York City area. He has been previously selected by MTV & 495 Productions with other DJs to perform internationally for thousands. Having been selected to perform with and remix multiple platinum selling artists, he has been featured as a guest curator for Trance Mix. He has been featured, interviewed or reviewed by Spin (France), Scotch & Murder Monthly, More Than Disco, Hot Biscuits, The Atlantic Monthly, Trip Hop Daily, Creme de le Creme, reverb, Music Under Fire, and Fahrenheit, and has multiple top-charting tracks and remixes on The Hype Machine and Beatport. THEE PAUSE was selected in February 2012 as a featured DJ for W Hotels Worldwide and a commissioned mix was made available exclusively on W Hotels Worldwide by Starwood Hotels and Resorts iPhone application.

Collaborations

Take Remedy
Take Remedy was a new collective on the New York City scene featuring Alice Love, THEE PAUSE, and Billy 'Vapor Eyes'. They have been described as a "combination of the alternative organic sound meets digital chaos". THEE PAUSE is bassist, programmer and provides back-up vocals. Lead vocals are provided by Alice Love. Billy Vapor Eyes plays drums, keyboards and rhythm guitars.

Their debut EP Hello successfully charted on two individual Hype Machine Top 100 singles charts without major label promotion, EyeView and Lines unusual for a new band with a debut EP.

Hello, the five track debut EP originally only available on 12" red limited edition vinyl via Projecting Nothing Records, is now  available worldwide digital via Organic Intelligence Records.

Announced March 24, 2012, THEE PAUSE began recording with artist Nikki Noir with producer DJ Alex J of Digable Planents fame for a late-2012 CD and digital release on Projecting Nothing Records titled Of The Echoes.

The Daisy Kids
In March 2013, THEE PAUSE joined forces with Scott Putesky, former lead guitarist and co-founder of the band Marilyn Manson, to form "The Daisy Kids". The Daisy Kids was an American hard rock group consisting of former Marilyn Manson guitarist Daisy Berkowitz and producer, multi-instrumentalist and bass player THEE PAUSE. Guest vocals on the Mr Conrad Samsung EP were provided by Justin Symbol of Nursing Home fame[2]. Numerous rough demos were recorded, including a yet to circulate four-song CD entitled The Samsung Sessions. That four-song CD/demo was shelved due to legal issues regarding the use of uncleared samples, and only one track from those recording sessions has surfaced to date.

Tracks known to have been recorded include:
 "White Knuckles", featuring Justin Symbol of Nursing Home on lead vocals, 
 "Thrift", 
 "Let Your Ego Die", 
 Square In The Minor the only commercially available CD and digital release.

With legal issues resolved, November 20, 2015, saw the release of the Mr Conrad Samsung EP, which had been delayed since 2013 and is the final released recording featuring guitarist and vocalist Scott Putesky prior to his passing in 2017.

Mr Conrad Samsung EP
After numerous delays due to internal health problems plaguing both band members[5] Daisy Berkowitz and THEE PAUSE, the Mr Conrad Samsung EP was released digitally on September 20, 2015, via Organic Intelligence Records internationally. Vocal duties were split on this EP between Daisy Berkowitz, THEE PAUSE and Justin Symbol. No tour was planned at the time as the band members focused on their health, and Justin Symbol continued to pursue his various solo and side projects.

Digital Release Track List:

     "Kill Baby" (intro) (Vocals; Daisy Berkowitz)
     "White Mountain Due" (Vocals; Justin Symbol)
     "Boheiman Rapecity (Kraft Cheese Ditty)" (Vocals; Daisy Berkowitz)
     "Let Your Ego Die" (Vocals; Daisy Berkowitz and THEE PAUSE)
     "Victim (Thrift)" (Vocals; THEE PAUSE)
     "Square in the Minor" (Vocals; Daisy Berkowitz)

Andy Stott's Numb (beauty of being) Remix
Andy Stott is a Manchester-based producer of dub and techno music who has released three albums with the Modern Love label. THEE PAUSE's remix of Andy Stott's "Numb" charted on Pitchfork's Top 200 Tracks of the Decade so Far.

Let's Go Somewhere Quiet
The first single from the THEE PAUSE produced album Let's Go Somewhere Quiet to benefit The Children's Brain Tumour Foundation featuring a remix of Lena Katina's track "Never Forget" was released on July 27, 2012, on Projecting Nothing Records. It also features an original unreleased track by THEE PAUSE.

Discography

LPs
 Silence Please, Atlantic, 2010
 You Can Does Not Equal You Should, Projecting Nothing 2011
 Take Remedy - Hello., KVZ, 2011 (Bass)
 Various Artists - Let's Go Somewhere Quiet, Projecting Nothing 2012 (Producer, artist and remix artist)

EPs
 Distort My Life With Noise, Projecting Nothing 2011
 Distort My Life With Noise II, Projecting Nothing 2011
 Take Remedy - Crash, (Producer & Bass) – Projecting Nothing/KVZ 2011
 The Daisy Kids - The Samsung Sessions - currently unreleased
 The Daisy Kids - Mr Conrad Samsung EP - Organic Intelligence/KVZ 2-15

Singles
 Simmi Angel, "Many Faces" (Producer) – Projecting Nothing 2011
 S26, "Memory", (Producer / Guest Remix) 2011
 Lost Shadow, "The Last Song We Will Sing" (Guest remix) Phonocratic Records
 Lost Shadow, Same Problems – Different Solutions" (Guest remix) Phonocratic Records, 2011
 Lena Katina, "Never Forget" (The Remixes) - (Producer and remix artist)
 The Daisy Kids, "Square In The Minor" - Organic Intelligence Records

Digital releases (Production, remixes and promotional)

 The Bangles
 Dead Prez
 Pictureplane
 Crystal Castles
 Radiohead
 Yeah Yeah Yeahs
 Richard Sander
 Lost Shadow
 Hidden Cat
 ClipdBeaks
 Shallow Sense
 Alice DeeJay
 S26
 Simmi Angel

Footnotes

References
 
 
 
 
 
 
 
 
 
 
 
 
 
 
 

1981 births
Living people
Musicians from Philadelphia
American experimental musicians